FV2 or variation, may refer to:

 Bateleur FV2, a South African mobile multiple rocket launcher truck
 Toyota FV2, a 2014 concept car
 FV2, a car from Facel, a version of the Facel Vega FVS

See also

 FV (disambiguation)
 FW (disambiguation)
 FVV (disambiguation)